The Mayor of Invercargill is the head of the municipal government of Invercargill, New Zealand, and leads the Invercargill City Council. The mayor is directly elected using a First Past the Post electoral system every three years. The current mayor is Nobby Clark. Invercargill also has a deputy mayor that is chosen from the council. There have been 44 mayors so far.

History
Invercargill was first proclaimed a municipality on 28 June 1871. On 26 August of that year, the first mayoral elections were held, and William Wood was elected as first mayor, defeating J.W. Mitchell by 191 to 140 votes. Unlike other municipalities, the mayor has always been elected "at large" (i.e., by the public), rather than (as for example in Christchurch) the councillors choosing one of their group.

Originally, mayoral elections were held on an annual basis. From 1915, mayors were elected for a two-year term; and, as of 1935, the mayoral term was extended to three years. There is an election in 2022.

When David Roche resigned the mayoralty in 1887, council appointed Aaron Blacke as mayor until an extraordinary election could be held. This was not done in strict accordance with the law, and Blacke is not included in official lists of Mayors of Invercargill.

Greater Invercargill was created on 10 January 1910 during Charles Steven Longuet's reign. Longuet was succeeded by William Ott, who was twice elected unopposed and did not seek re-election in 1912.

Invercargill was proclaimed a city on 1 March 1930 during John D. Campbell's mayoralty.

There has been one woman mayor so far – Eve Poole. She has also been the only Jewish mayor, though earlier mayor Abraham Wachner was also of Jewish descent. A library building is named after Poole. She died in office in 1992. Tim Shadbolt was invited to run in the resulting by-election and claimed a surprising victory. Shadbolt is the current mayor. The 2010 election win made Shadbolt the longest-serving mayor in New Zealand, with this being his 8th mayoral term (his 6th term in Invercargill).

Members of Parliament
Seven former mayors have also been Members of Parliament, and all of them represented the Invercargill electorate (the years in brackets give their term in Parliament):
 William Wood (1866–1870)
 John Cuthbertson (1873–1875)
 George Lumsden (1875–1878)
 James Walker Bain (1879–1881)
 Joseph Hatch (1884–1887)
 Josiah Hanan (1899–1925)
 Ralph Hanan (1946–1969)

List of mayors of Invercargill
Invercargill has had 44 mayors so far:

List of deputy mayors of Invercargill

Timeline

References

Sources

 
Invercargill
Mayors of places in Southland, New Zealand